Rajania is a genus of plants in the Dioscoreaceae. It is native to the West Indies, with 14 of the 17 known species found in Cuba.

 Rajania angustifolia Sw. - Cuba, Haiti
 Rajania cephalocarpa Uline ex R.Knuth - Cuba
 Rajania cordata L. - Cuba, Hispaniola, Puerto Rico, Jamaica, Lesser Antilles
 Rajania ekmanii R.Knuth  - Cuba
 Rajania hastata L. - Hispaniola
 Rajania microphylla Kunth - Bahamas, Cuba
 Rajania nipensis R.A.Howard - Cuba
 Rajania ovata Sw. - Cuba, Hispaniola
 Rajania pilifera Urb. - Haiti
 Rajania porulosa R.Knuth  - Cuba
 Rajania psilostachya (Kunth) Uline - Cuba
 Rajania quinquefolia L. - Cuba, Hispaniola
 Rajania spiculiflora Uline ex R.Knuth - Haiti
 Rajania tenella R.A.Howard - Cuba
 Rajania tenuiflora R.Knuth  - Cuba, Hispaniola
 Rajania theresensis Uline ex R.Knuth - Cuba
 Rajania wrightii Uline ex R.Knuth - Cuba

References

Dioscoreaceae
Dioscoreales genera